Polichna was a town in the eastern part of ancient Crete, near ancient Praesus.

Its site is tentatively located near the modern Trypitos, Petras.

References

Populated places in ancient Crete
Former populated places in Greece